Wayne Visser is a writer, speaker, film producer, academic, editor of poetry, social entrepreneur and futurist focused on sustainable development, corporate social responsibility and creating integrated value.

Biography 
Wayne Visser was born in Bulawayo, Zimbabwe, raised in Cape Town, South Africa and now lives in London, United Kingdom. Wayne Visser completed his high school at Fairbairn College in 1987 and went on to study marketing and economics as part of a Business Science Honours degree at the University of Cape Town. In 1996, he studied at the Centre for Human Ecology, where he obtained an MSc with special commendation.

Visser's early career was spent as a management consultant, first as a strategy analyst for Capgemini and then as director of sustainability services for KPMG in South Africa. In 1995, he established a Johannesburg chapter of The World Business Academy and in 1997, he co-founded the South African New Economics Foundation. In 2007, he qualified with a PhD in business and management from the International Centre for Corporate Social Responsibility at Nottingham University Business School, where he researched what motivates of sustainability managers, using existential psychology as his lens of analysis. In 2008, he set up the research sharing platform CSR International and in 2012 started the think tank and media company Kaleidoscope Futures.

 he is professor of integrated value and holder of the chair in sustainable transformation at Antwerp Management School. He is a fellow and former research director at the University of Cambridge Institute for Sustainability Leadership and visiting professor at the  Gordon Institute of Business Science.

Recognition 
The Fast Company business magazine claims that "anyone interested in CSR will eventually come across Wayne Visser. He is very active in the field, and offers a unique and candid voice on the topic". CSRWire USA calls him "one of the most prolific, creative and original thought leaders on CSR and author/editor of books on the subject".

 Top 100 Thought Leaders in Trustworthy Business Behavior (2013), ranking by Excellence and Trust Across America
 Top 100 Global Sustain Ability Leaders (2011 & 2012), rankings by ABC Carbon
 Top 100 Thought Leaders in Europe & the Middle East (2011), ranking by Centre for Sustainability & Excellence and Trust Across America
 Top 100 CSR Leaders (2009) and Top 20 Sustainability Leaders (2012), rankings by CSR International
 Global CSR Excellence & Leadership Award (2013), awarded by the World CSR Congress
 Outstanding Author Contribution Award at the Emerald Literati Network Awards for Excellence (2011),
 Outstanding Teacher Award of The Warwick Business School MBA (2010/11 & 2011/12) and Masters in Management (2011/12).

Integrated Value
Visser's research and writing proposes going beyond creating shared value and corporate social responsibility to thriving and the creation of Integrated Value. He promotes sustainable enterprise and the idea of CSR as "corporate sustainability and responsibility" and calls for an evolution from CSR 1.0 to CSR 2.0. His theory of CSR 2.0 characterises CSR maturity into five stages, from defensive, charitable, promotional and strategic CSR (all labelled CSR 1.0) to systemic or transformative CSR (called CSR 2.0). He identifies three failures of CSR 1.0 (incremental, peripheral and uneconomic), five principles of CSR 2.0 (creativity, scalability, responsiveness, glocality and circularity) and four DNA elements of CSR 2.0 (value creation, good governance, societal contribution and environmental integrity). The CSR 2.0 theory is summarised in his books, The Age of Responsibility and CSR 2.0.

Publications
Wayne Visser has written and edited 41 books and published more than 320 chapters and articles. He writes a regular column on international sustainable business for the HuffPost website, and The Guardian UK newspaper. His book, Beyond Reasonable Greed, was made into a film called Lessons From The Wild: Leadership – Tusks or Fangs. His poem "I Am An African", from his anthology of the same name, was the basis for a dance theatre production at South Africa's 2012 National Arts Festival in Grahamstown. and an inspiration behind Heleen du Plessis's Cello for Africa CD

Business and sustainability
 Thriving: The Breakthrough Movement to Regenerate Nature Society, and the Economy, New York: Fast Company Press, 2022.
 The Little Book of Quotations on Sustainable Business, London: Kaleidoscope Futures, 2017.
 The Little Book of Quotations on Social Responsibility, London: Kaleidoscope Futures, 2016.
 The World Guide to Sustainable Enterprise: Volumes 1–4, Sheffield: Greenleaf, 2016.
 Sustainable Frontiers: Unlocking Change Through Business, Leadership and Innovation, Sheffield: Greenleaf, 2015.
 The CSR International Research Compendium: Volume 1 (Governance), Volume 2 (Environment) and Volume 3 (Society), London: Kaleidoscope Futures, 2015.
 Disrupting the Future: Great Ideas for Creating a Much Better World, London: Kaleidoscope Futures, 2014.
 CSR 2.0: Transforming Corporate Sustainability and Responsibility, London: Springer, 2013.
 The Quest for Sustainable Business: An Epic Journey in Search of Corporate Responsibility, Sheffield: Greenleaf, 2012.
 Corporate Sustainability & Responsibility: An Introductory Text on CSR Theory & Practice – Past, Present & Future, London: Kaleidoscope Futures, 2012.
 The Age of Responsibility: CSR 2.0 and the New DNA of Business, London: Wiley, 2011.
 The World Guide to CSR: A Country by Country Analysis of Corporate Sustainability and Responsibility, with N. Tolhurst. Sheffield: Greenleaf, 2010.
 The Top 50 Sustainability Books, with CPSL. Sheffield: Greenleaf, 2009.
 Landmarks for Sustainability: Events and Initiatives that Changed Our World, with CPSL. Sheffield: Greenleaf, 2009.
 Making A Difference: Purpose-Inspired Leadership for Corporate Sustainability & Responsibility, Saarbrücken: VDM, 2008.
 The A to Z of Corporate Social Responsibility: A Complete Reference Guide to Concepts, Codes and Organisations, with D. Matten, Manfred Pohl & N. Tolhurst. London: Wiley, 2007. 
 Corporate Citizenship in Africa: Lessons from the Past, Paths to the Future, with M. McIntosh & C. MiddletonSheffield: Greenleaf, 2006.
 Business Frontiers: Social Responsibility, Sustainable Development and Economic Justice, Hyderabad: ICFAI University Press, 2005.
 South Africa: Reasons to Believe, with G. Lundy. Cape Town: Aardvark Press, 2003.
 Beyond Reasonable Greed: Why Sustainable Business is a Much Better Idea, with C. Sunter. Cape Town: Tafelberg Human & Rousseau, 2002.

Poetry
 I Am An African: Favourite Africa Poems, 5th ed., Kaleidoscope Futures, 2017.
 Life in Transit: Favourite Travel & Tribute Poems, 2nd ed., Kaleidoscope Futures, 2017.
 Icarus: Favourite Love Poems, 2nd ed., Kaleidoscope Futures, 2017.
 This is Tomorrow: Artists for a Sustainable Future, with A. Ardakani, 1st ed., Blurb, 2015.
 African Dream: Inspirational Words & Images from the Luminous Continent, with B. Webzell, 1st ed., Blurb, 2012.
 String, Donuts, Bubbles and Me: Favourite Philosophical Poems, 2nd ed., Lulu, 2017.
 Seize the Day: Favourite Inspirational Poems, 3rd ed., Kaleidoscope Futures, 2017.
 Wishing Leaves: Favourite Nature Poems, 3rd ed., Kaleidoscope Futures, 2017.

Films
Visser was a producer on the 2015 climate change documentary Sinking Nation, along with Emmy Award-winning director, Graham Sheldon. In 2016/17, they collaborated again on a documentary film on the circular economy called Closing the Loop.

References

External links 
 Wayne Visser's official website

Attribution

English environmentalists
People from Bulawayo
South African expatriates in the United Kingdom
South African people of Dutch descent
Zimbabwean people of Dutch descent
University of Cape Town alumni
White Rhodesian people
Zimbabwean emigrants to South Africa